Bertram Stanley Mitford Bowyer, 2nd Baron Denham,  (3 October 1927 – 1 December 2021), was a British Conservative politician, hereditary peer, writer and former member of the House of Lords. He was one of the few people to serve in the governments of five different prime ministers.

Biography 
Denham was educated at Eton and King's College, Cambridge. He was the youngest child and second son of George Bowyer, 1st Baron Denham, and succeeded his father to become 2nd Baron Denham and 2nd Baronet, of Weston Underwood, when he died in 1948, his elder brother having been killed in the Second World War. In 1950 he also succeeded his kinsman, Sir George Bowyer, Bt., as 10th Baronet, of Denham Court.

Denham served as a House of Lords whip from 1961 until 1964, under both Harold Macmillan and Alec Douglas-Home. Upon the Conservatives return to power at the 1970 general election, he was once again made a whip under Edward Heath. In 1972, he was promoted to become Captain of the Yeomen of the Guard, the post associated with being the Government Deputy Chief Whip in the House of Lords. He served in this post until the Conservatives left power in 1974.

Upon the victory of Margaret Thatcher in the 1979 general election, Denham was made Captain of the Gentlemen-at-Arms, the post associated with being Government Chief Whip in the House of Lords. He held the post for the entirety of the Thatcher years, leaving office six months into the John Major government in 1991. He was made a Privy Councillor in the 1981 New Year Honours, and in the 1991 New Year Honours was appointed a Knight Commander of the Order of the British Empire (KBE) for his political service.

With the passage of the House of Lords Act 1999, Denham and almost all other hereditary peers lost their automatic right to sit in the House of Lords. He was however elected as one of the 92 elected hereditary peers to remain in the Lords pending completion of House of Lords reform. Following the death of Lord Carrington in July 2018, Denham became the longest-serving current member of the House of Lords. He retired from the House after 71 years' service on 26 April 2021.

He died on 1 December 2021, at the age of 94.

Literary career 
As Bertie Denham, Bowyer wrote four mysteries featuring detection by House of Lords Conservative Whip Derek Thyrde, second Viscount Thyrde. He was a member of the Detection Club, and contributed to their 2020 anthology Howdunit: A Masterclass in Crime Writing by Members of the Detection Club.

Novels by Bertie Denham 
 The Man Who Lost His Shadow (1979) 
 Two Thyrdes (1983) 
 Foxhunt (1988) 
 Black Rod (1997)

Arms

References

Sources

External links 
 

1927 births
2021 deaths
Alumni of King's College, Cambridge
Barons in the Peerage of the United Kingdom
Conservative Party (UK) Baronesses- and Lords-in-Waiting
Honourable Corps of Gentlemen at Arms
Knights Commander of the Order of the British Empire
Members of the Privy Council of the United Kingdom
Ministers in the Macmillan and Douglas-Home governments, 1957–1964
People educated at Eton College
Members of the Detection Club
British crime fiction writers
20th-century British novelists
Honourable Artillery Company soldiers
Place of birth missing
Place of death missing
Younger sons of barons
Hereditary peers elected under the House of Lords Act 1999